Petar Berislavić (or Péter Beriszló in Hungarian) (Trogir, 1475 – 20 May 1520), a member of the Berislavići Trogirski noble family, was the ban (viceroy) of Croatia from 1513 to 1520 and also bishop of Veszprém.

Petar was born in Trogir. Before he became ban he rose to the title of bishop of Veszprém in the Roman Catholic Church. He is most known for being one of the leaders of the Croats during the Ottoman invasions into their territory. He is also said to have been an associate of the writer Marko Marulić.

Petar had two decisive victories against the Ottoman force. The first in 1513 at the battle of Dubica and the second in 1518 near Jajce. In 1520 he was killed and beheaded after the battle of Plješevica between Bihać and Korenica.

References

Bans of Croatia
16th-century Roman Catholic bishops in Croatia
Berislavić noble family
15th-century Croatian nobility
16th-century Croatian nobility
1520 deaths
People from Trogir
16th-century Roman Catholic bishops in Hungary
Military commanders of Croatian kingdoms
Medieval Croatian nobility
1475 births
Bishops of Veszprém
Royal treasurers (Kingdom of Hungary)
16th-century Croatian military personnel